Manay (also spelled Man-ay), officially the Municipality of Manay, is a 2nd class municipality in the province of Davao Oriental, Philippines. According to the 2020 census, it has a population of 39,572 people.

Manay is located in Davao Oriental seated the Philippine Sea, bordering Banaybanay, Lupon, Pantukan (Davao de Oro), and Caraga. Manay is the one of the beautiful municipalities across from Davao Oriental. The main attractions are Tagdalid Falls, (geographically centre of Manay), Rising Sun Beach Resort and more. The municipality's covering tropical rainforest climates.

Geography

Climate
Manay has a tropical rainforest climate (Af) with heavy to very heavy rainfall year-round.

Barangays
Manay is politically subdivided into 17 barangays.

Demographics

Manay's population was decreased about 1.48% of the Municipality of Manay.

Economy 

The Municipality of Manay have poverty incidence, covering 37.07% of the GDP per capita.

References

External links
 Manay Profile at the DTI Cities and Municipalities Competitive Index
 [ Philippine Standard Geographic Code]
 Philippine Census Information
 Local Governance Performance Management System

Municipalities of Davao Oriental